The Barrel of Butter, formerly known as Carlin Skerry, is a skerry in Scapa Flow in the Orkney Islands.

Geography and geology
The rock is old red sandstone of the Devonian period. There is no soil of any significance on it.

Located in Scapa Flow, between Mainland and Cava, it has a section permanently above sea level. It is to the north east of Cava, and south of Orphir. It is also north of Flotta.

History
Formerly known as Carlin Skerry, the rock gained its strange name, not from its shape, or position, as is often the case, but from the annual rent paid on it, by the residents of Orphir. In return for a barrel of butter per year, they gained permission from the local laird to hunt the seals on it.

Some of these are still popular with divers.

See also

 List of lighthouses in Scotland
 List of Northern Lighthouse Board lighthouses
 Gutter Sound

References

External links
 Northern Lighthouse Board 

Butter
Scapa Flow
Uninhabited islands of Orkney